Tasha Marie Nelson  (born July 1, 1974) is an American former alpine skier who competed in the 1998 Winter Olympics and 2002 Winter Olympics. She was born in Mound, Minnesota.

References 
 

1974 births
Living people
People from Mound, Minnesota
American female alpine skiers
Olympic alpine skiers of the United States
Alpine skiers at the 1998 Winter Olympics
Alpine skiers at the 2002 Winter Olympics
21st-century American women